The Canon EF 100 mm lenses are used for Canon DSLR cameras. There are four different types of EF 100 mm lens for Canon. Certain lenses are best for macro photos, whereas other lenses are good for taking pictures of subjects from a distance.

EF 100 mm 2.8 Macro USM lens

The EF 100 mm 2.8 Macro USM lens is a prime lens made by Canon Inc. It is of the EF lens mount that fits the EOS camera system. There are three versions, the original, a second that adds a USM autofocus motor, and a recently released L series version that incorporates Image Stabilization (IS).

It is a macro lens, meaning that it is capable of reproducing an object the size of the image sensor, known as 1:1 magnification. Despite the macro designation, the lens can focus to infinity like regular lenses. As such, it is appropriate for use as a portrait lens.

This lens can be used with an extension tube, which increases the maximum magnification to 1.19× (EF 12 II) or 1.39× (EF 25 II). In these cases, focusing at infinity is sacrificed, with maximum distance reduced to 1002 mm (3.3 ft) and 606 mm (2.0 ft) respectively.

EF 100 mm 2.8L Macro IS USM lens

The EF 100 mm 2.8L Macro IS USM lens is the second macro lens in the Canon L series. It incorporates IS, improved build quality, weather sealing, and a new lens configuration resulting in improved MTF plots. This is the first lens on the market to incorporate Canon's new Hybrid Image Stabilization Technology. Hybrid IS effectively compensates for both angular and shift camera shake during close-up shooting.

This lens requires the Macro Lite Adapter 67 to be used with the MR-14EX and MT-24EX macro flashes.

EF 100 mm 2.0 USM lens

The EF 100 mm 2.0 USM lens is a compact medium telephoto lens with a large aperture.  Its physical and optical characteristics are similar to the Canon EF 85 mm 1.8 lens.

Since this lens is not a macro lens, it is lighter and smaller than the macro lenses. It is also a stop faster. Therefore, it can act as an excellent general-purpose lens. It can be used for candids, street photography, and other situations where a somewhat narrower field of view compared to the standard 50 mm lens is useful. Its fast maximum aperture lends itself to low-light photography like standard lenses, with excellent performance wide open.

The addition of EF Extension Tubes allows close-up and partial macro-like photography using this lens.

Specifications

References

External links 

 Canon's Official EOS Page (Flash required)
 EF100mm f/2.8 Macro USM at the Canon Camera Museum
 EF100mm f/2.8L Macro IS USM at the Canon Camera Museum
 EF100mm f/2 USM at the Canon Camera Museum

Canon EF 100 mm f2.8 Macro USM|Canon EF 100 mm f2.8 Macro IS USM
Canon EF lenses